Monika Míčková (born 29 July 1991) is a retired Czech rhythmic gymnast. She is the 2012 Grand Prix Final All-around bronze medalist.

Career 
Míčková has competed 6 times at the World Championships since 2007 as an individual and group gymnast, she has also competed in the World Cup and Grand Prix series.

In 2012, the absence of most veteran rhythmic gymnasts competing in Grand Prix after the 2012 Summer Olympics. Competing in home crowd at the 2012 Grand Prix Final in Brno, she was able to win the bronze medal in all-around  ahead of Azeri gymnast Lala Yusifova who finished 4th, she also won silver in ball and bronze in ribbon final. Míčková had her highest placement at the 2013 European Championships finishing 17th in the all-around. She finished 13th in all-around at the 2013 Summer Universiade in Kazan. She finished 6th in all-around at the 2014 Brno Grand Prix.

In 2016, Mickova finished 24th in the all-around at the 2016 Grand Prix Moscow. On 17–20 March Mickova then competed at the 2016 Lisboa World Cup where she finished 17th in the all-around. At the 30th Thiais Grand Prix event in Paris, she finished 19th in the all-around. On 1–3 April Mickova competed at the 2016 Pesaro World Cup where she finished 33rd in the all-around. On 6–8 May Mickova competed at the Brno Grand Prix finishing 8th in the all-around and qualified to all 4 apparatus finals. She announced her retirement on her Facebook account on 16 May.

References

External links
 

1991 births
Living people
Czech rhythmic gymnasts
Sportspeople from Brno